Laboulaye is a city in the southeast of the province of Córdoba, Argentina. It lies on National Route 7, near the provincial borders of Santa Fe and Buenos Aires, about 315 km south from Córdoba City and 285 km west from Rosario.

Climate

References

 

Populated places in Córdoba Province, Argentina
Populated places established in 1886
Cities in Argentina
Argentina
Córdoba Province, Argentina